Richard Lincoln (1707–1763) was an Irish Roman Catholic bishop.

Born in Dublin, Lincoln studied in the Irish College in Salamanca. Lincoln was ordained priest in 1730. Lincoln was appointed co-adjutator to Bishop Linegar, and was appointed Archbishop of Dublin in 1757. He received the degree of Doctor of Divinity (DD). He died in post on 18 June 1763, at Smithfield, Dublin, and was buried in St. James graveyard.

Notes

1707 births
1763 deaths
Christian clergy from Dublin (city)
18th-century Roman Catholic archbishops in Ireland
Roman Catholic archbishops of Dublin